Caenorhabditis elegans Cer13 virus is a species of virus in the genus Semotivirus and the family Belpaoviridae. It exists as retrotransposons in the Caenorhabditis elegans genome.

References 

 Frame IG, Cutfield JF, Poulter RTM (2001) New BEL-like LTR-retrotransposons in Fugu rubripes, Caenorhabditis elegans, and Drosophila melanogaster. Gene 263(1–2), pages 219–230,

External links
 
 ICTVdB Index of Viruses
 Descriptions of Plant Viruses 
 

Metaviridae
RNA reverse-transcribing viruses
Caenorhabditis elegans